Mariaba semifascia is a moth in the family Geometridae. It is found in New Guinea and on the Solomon Islands and Sulawesi.

References

Moths described in 1903
Eupitheciini